Sidory is a rural locality (a selo) in Mikhaylovka Urban Okrug, Volgograd Oblast, Russia. The population was 2,515 as of 2010. There are 34 streets.

Geography 
Sidory is located 12 km northeast of Mikhaylovka. Sebrovo is the nearest rural locality.

References 

Rural localities in Mikhaylovka urban okrug